Jarosław Bogoria of Skotniki (c. 1276 – 17 September 1376) was a Polish nobleman and bishop, member of the Bogoriowie family of the Bogorya.

He was a son of Piotr of Bogoria and Skotniki. Jaroslaw studied law and theology at the University of Bologna, becoming provost from 1316 to 1322. Returning home, he became canon of Kraków and chancellor of the bishop of Kraków Nankier. In 1326 he became archdeacon of Kraków and in 1334 canon of Kuyavia and Gniezno. From 1331 until 1337 he was chancellor of Kuyavia. On 8 July 1342 in Avignon, Pope Clement VI appointed him archbishop of Gniezno. In 1374 he resigned for blindness and went to a monastery. He died on 17 September 1376 at Kalisz.

References

External links
 Virtual tour Gniezno Cathedral  

Archbishops of Gniezno
14th-century Roman Catholic archbishops in Poland
Bogoriowie family
Canons of Gniezno
Canons of Kraków
Canons of Włocławek
1270s births
1376 deaths
Year of birth uncertain
13th-century Polish nobility
14th-century Polish nobility